|}

The Celebration Mile is a Group 2 flat horse race in Great Britain open to horses aged three years or older. It is run at Goodwood over a distance of 1 mile (1,609 metres), and it is scheduled to take place each year in late August.

History
The event was established in 1967, and it was originally called the Wills Mile. It was renamed the Goodwood Mile in 1971, and from this point it was classed at Group 3 level.

The race became known as the Waterford Crystal Mile in 1975, and it was promoted to Group 2 status in 1977. It was given its present title in 1989.

The leading horses from the Celebration Mile often go on to compete in the Queen Elizabeth II Stakes. The last to win both in the same year was Poet's Voice in 2010.

Records
Most successful horse (2 wins):
 Chic – 2004, 2005
 Lightning Spear - 2016, 2017

Leading jockey (4 wins):
 Joe Mercer – Brigadier Gerard (1971), Sallust (1972), Captain James (1978), Kris (1979)
 Willie Carson – Known Fact (1980), Bold Russian (1991), Mehthaaf (1994), Harayir (1995)
 Greville Starkey – To-Agori-Mou (1981), Sandhurst Prince (1982), Rousillon (1984), Then Again (1986)

Leading trainer (8 wins):
 Sir Michael Stoute – Milligram (1987), Among Men (1997), Medicean (2000), No Excuse Needed (2001), Chic (2004, 2005), Echelon (2007), Zacinto (2009)

Winners

See also
 Horse racing in Great Britain
 List of British flat horse races
 Recurring sporting events established in 1967  – this race is included under its original title, Wills Mile.

References
 Racing Post:
 galopp-sieger.de – Celebration Mile (ex Wills Mile).
 horseracingintfed.com – International Federation of Horseracing Authorities – Celebration Mile (2018).
 pedigreequery.com – Celebration Mile – Goodwood.
 

Flat races in Great Britain
Goodwood Racecourse
Open mile category horse races
1967 establishments in England